The 1993 NBA All-Star Game  took place on February 21, 1993, and was an exhibition game played between the Eastern Conference and the Western Conference at the Delta Center in Salt Lake City, home of the Utah Jazz. This was the 43rd edition National Basketball Association all-star game played during the 1992-1993 season. The Western Conference went on to beat the East 135 to 132 in overtime. The All-Star Weekend then wrapped up with the slam dunk competition, won by Harold Miner from the Miami Heat, and the three-point shootout, won by Mark Price from the Cleveland Cavaliers.  The regular season then continued on Tuesday, February 23, 1993.

Coaches 
The coaches for the 1993 NBA All-Star Game were chosen for the best current season win percentage in their conference through the games of February 18, 1993.

The head coach for the Eastern Conference was Pat Riley, head coach of the New York Knicks for the regular season, and his 9th NBA All-Star appearance as a head coach. The head coach for the Western Conference was Paul Westphal, first  year as head coach of the Phoenix Suns for the regular season.

Players
The 1993 NBA All-Star game would be a highlight for many NBA players. This would be Michael Jordan's last NBA All-Star game before leaving the NBA for the first time, although he would return to play in five more. For Isiah Thomas, this would be his last NBA All-Star appearance; meanwhile, this would also be the All-Star debut of Shaquille O'Neal, and the first time the Orlando Magic and Charlotte Hornets franchises ever had a player in the NBA All-Star Game. Karl Malone and John Stockton were both awarded MVP. The starters for the Eastern Conference included: Michael Jordan as shooting guard, Isiah Thomas as point guard, Scottie Pippen as small forward, Larry Johnson as power forward, and Shaquille O'Neal as center. The starters for the Western Conference included: Clyde Drexler as shooting guard, John Stockton as point guard Charles Barkley as small forward, Karl Malone as Power forward, and David Robinson as Center. All starters would end up in the Naismith Memorial Basketball Hall of Fame except for Larry Johnson. Mitch Richmond on Western Conference was injured and replaced by Terry Porter. Chris Mullin on the Western Conference team was also injured; however, he was not replaced by anyone.

Rosters

Chris Mullin and Mitch Richmond were selected to play but couldn't due to injury.

Mitch Richmond was replaced by Terry Porter.

Chris Mullin was not replaced by anyone.

Score by Periods

Halftime— West, 57-52
Third Quarter— West, 86-84
Officials: Jack Madden, Hue Hollins, and Bennett Salvatore
Attendance: 19,459.

References

National Basketball Association All-Star Game
All-Star
NBA All-Star
GMA Network television specials
February 1993 sports events in the United States